Magic Attraction is the second album by Japanese singer Nana Mizuki, released on 6 November 2002.

Track listing
Theme of Magic Attraction (Instrumental)
Composition, arrangement: Tsutomu Ohira
Through the night
Lyrics: Toshiro Yabuki
Composition, arrangement: Takahiro Iida
Protection
Lyrics, composition, arrangement: Toshiro Yabuki

Lyrics, composition, arrangement: Toshiro Yabuki

Composition: Honma Akimitsu 
Arrangement: Honma Akimitsu, Tsutomu Ohira
Stand
Lyrics, composition, arrangement: Toshiro Yabuki, Tsutomu Ohira
deep sea
Lyrics: Kazue Tsuda
Composition, arrangement: Tsutomu Ohira

Lyrics, composition, arrangement: Toshiro Yabuki

Lyrics, composition: Shikura Chiyomaru
Arrangement: Tsutomu Ohira
Ending theme for PS2 game Memories Off Duet
Love & History
Lyrics: Chokkyu Murano
Composition: Ataru Sumiyoshi 
Arrangement: Nobuhiro Makino
Juliet
Lyrics, composition: Shikura Chiyomaru 
Arrangement: Toshimichi Isoe
climb up
Lyrics, composition, arrangement: Toshiro Yabuki
Brilliant Star
Lyrics, composition: Shikura Chiyomaru 
Arrangement: Toshimichi Isoe
Power Gate
Lyrics, composition, arrangement: Toshiro Yabuki

Lyrics: Kazue Tsuda
Composition, arrangement: Tsutomu Ohira

Charts

External links
  

2002 albums
Nana Mizuki albums